In the theory of permutation patterns, a skew-merged permutation is a permutation that can be partitioned into an increasing sequence and a decreasing sequence.

Characterization
The two smallest permutations that cannot be partitioned into an increasing and a decreasing sequence are 3412 and 2143.  was the first to establish that a skew-merged permutation can also be equivalently defined as a permutation that avoids the two patterns 3412 and 2143.

A permutation is skew-merged if and only if its associated permutation graph is a split graph, a graph that can be partitioned into a clique (corresponding to the descending subsequence) and an independent set (corresponding to the ascending subsequence). The two forbidden patterns for skew-merged permutations, 3412 and 2143, correspond to two of the three forbidden induced subgraphs for split graphs, a four-vertex cycle and a graph with two disjoint edges, respectively. The third forbidden induced subgraph, a five-vertex cycle, cannot exist in a permutation graph (see ).

Enumeration
For  the number of skew-merged permutations of length  is
1, 2, 6, 22, 86, 340, 1340, 5254, 20518, 79932, 311028, 1209916, 4707964, 18330728, ... .

 was the first to show that the generating function of these numbers is

from which it follows that the number of skew-merged permutations of length  is given by the formula

and that these numbers obey the recurrence relation

Computational complexity

References
.

.

. See also the attached comment by Volker Strehl.

. See in particular Theorem 2.9, pp. 303–304.

Permutation patterns